Ekkathat or Borommoracha III or King of Suriyamarin Throne Hall was the 6th monarch of the Ban Phlu Luang dynasty, the 33rd and the last monarch of Ayutthaya Kingdom, ruling from 1758 to 7 April 1767, prior to the fall of Ayutthaya. Moreover, he was called by the people in his time as "King Khiruean", which meant "the king with skin disease", due to his chloasma.

Reign 
Ekkathat, Prince Anurakmontri, was a son of Borommakot. His elder brother, Prince Thammathibet, was made the Front Palace in 1732. However, Thammathibet had an affair with two of his father's wives. Ekkathat, upon knowing this, told Boromakot about the lovers. Thammathibet was thus beaten to death in 1746. Ekkathat, who was then next in the succession line, were expected to be the Front Palace. However, Borommakot halted the appointment because of Ekkathat's incompetence.

One year before his death, Borommakot decided to skip Ekkathat, forcing him into the priesthood, and appointed Ekkathat's younger brother, Uthumphon, as the Front Palace. In May 1758, Borommakot died. Uthumphon was then crowned. However, two months after that, Ekkathat returned and claimed for the throne. Ekkathat settled himself in the Suriyat Amarin Palace—therefore came his name Somdet Phra Thi Nang Suriyat Amarin (Literally: the King of Suriyat Amarin Palace).  Uthumphon arrested and executed his half-brothers Krom Mun Chit Sunthon, Krom Mun Sunthon Thep and Krom Mun Sep Phakdi. Uthumphon then willingly abdicated, entered the priesthood, and Ekkathat was crowned (August 1758).

According to an account of Siamese captive after the fall of Ayutthaya, the early years of Ekathat witnessed the revival attempt. The king followed the tradition by donating money to temples. Building of new temples occurred. The trade with foreigners was supported. The western coast ports such as Mergui and Tenasserim were active. However, according to the Burmese and English accounts, when the Mons took refuge in the kingdom, after the Burmese conquest, Ayutthaya became the next target of the Burmese.

However, the king "was incompetent and only interested in the different pleasures of the flesh."

Burmese Invasion and Ayutthaya's Downfall 

In 1759, Alaungpaya ordered his second son, Hsinbyushin, to attack Tenasserim and Mergui, telling Siam their friendship with Burma was ended since Siam refused to deliver a rebel Mon nobleman who had fled in a French vessel to Mergui.  Meeting little resistance, the Burmese continued their advance by attacking other Siamese provincial towns.  After capturing Phetchaburi, Alaungpaya decided to advance to Ayutthaya in 1760.

The Siamese capital was in confusion and an uproar after the Burmese had taken Ratchaburi.  Ekkathat was forced to invite his abdicated brother, Uthumphon, to leave the priesthood and resume the sovereignty.  Ekkathat became Somdet Phrachao Luang, "king who had abdicated his throne".  Uthumphon then prepared the capital for a siege.

However, Alaungpaya was wounded during the siege, and died during the Burmese retreat.

This postponed the death of Ayutthaya for another 7 years.

Siam under Ekkathat was in turmoil. Ayutthaya lost its control over network cities and Ekkathat was said to be indulged by the luxury of the court and concubines. The peasants went on the rebellion. In 1766, the Burmese armies again invaded Siam—through Mergui under Mahanoratha and Lanna under Neimyo Thihapate after subjugating Lanna and Laotian kingdoms. The Burmese captured various peripheral cities to cut down any supports given to Ayutthaya. A Dutch source said the court faced bankruptcy. The capital totally lost contact with its satellite. Ayutthaya was then helpless.

Local accounts told that Ekkathat desperately tried to counter the Burmese. He ordered his remaining armies and fleets to counter the Burmese at Ratchaburi and Thon Buri, but the Burmese crushed them all. The two Burmese armies joined at Ayutthaya and laid the siege on the city. A foreign account claimed that Ekathat and his family secretly fled from the capital. The nobles then agreed to surrender. On April 7, 1767, Ayutthaya fell. The Burmese looted and burnt the city to the ground.

Death
Siamese chronicles said Ekkathat died upon having been in starvation for more than ten days while concealing himself at Ban Chik Woods, adjacent to Wat Sangkhawat., where his dead body was discovered by a monk. Another possibility was that he was captured and taken to the Burmese encampment at Pho Sam Ton, where he died shortly thereafter. He was buried at a mound named "Khok Phra Men", in front of a revered Siamese temple called "Phra Wihan Phra Mongkhonlabophit".

The Burmese occupation did not last long. By the end of 1767, the remaining Burmese troops in Siam had been recalled to defend their homeland against the Chinese invasions (1765–1769), leaving Siam in a power vacuum. Taksin (governor of Tak) founded the Kingdom of Thonburi in 1768, and emerged as the primary contender by 1769.

Issue

Ancestry

References

1767 deaths
Ban Phlu Luang dynasty
Kings of Ayutthaya
Year of birth unknown
18th-century monarchs in Asia
18th-century Thai monarchs
Thai male Chao Fa
Princes of Ayutthaya
18th-century Thai people